Expressway S69 or express road S69 (in Polish droga ekspresowa S69) was a major road in Poland which was supposed to run from Bielsko-Biała to the border with Slovakia at Zwardoń/Skalité, where it would connect with Slovak motorway D3. In the original plans, from Bielsko-Biała to Żywiec, the road was to be a dual carriageway with the remaining part to the border with Slovakia a single carriageway only (with terrain reserves for construction of second carriageway in future). Since August 2016, the S69 is part of expressway S1.

Route description

References

Expressways in Poland
Proposed roads in Poland